This article documents the 1989–90 season of football club Millwall F.C.

League table

Results

First Division

FA Cup

League Cup

Full Members' Cup

Squad

References 

Millwall F.C. seasons
Millwall F.C.